VA249 may refer to:
 Ariane flight VA249, an Ariane 5 launch that occurred on 6 August 2019
 Virgin Australia flight 249, with IATA flight number VA249
 Virginia State Route 249 (SR 249 or VA-249), a primary state highway in the United States